A potboiler or pot-boiler is a novel, play, opera, film, or other creative work of dubious literary or artistic merit, whose main purpose was to pay for the creator's daily expenses—thus the imagery of "boil the pot", which means "to provide one's livelihood." Authors who create potboiler novels or screenplays are sometimes called hack writers or hacks. Novels deemed to be potboilers may also be called pulp fiction, and potboiler films may be called "popcorn movies."

Usage

High culture
"In the more elevated arenas of artistry such a motive...was considered deeply demeaning." If a serious playwright or novelist's creation is deemed a potboiler, this has a negative connotation that suggests that it is a mediocre or inferior-quality work.

Historical usages
In 1854 Putnam’s Magazine used the term in the following sentence: “He has not carelessly dashed off his picture, with the remark that ‘it will do for a pot-boiler’”.
Jane Scovell's Oona: Living in the Shadows states that "...the play was a mixed blessing. Through it O'Neill latched on to a perennial source of income, but the promise of his youth was essentially squandered on a potboiler."
Lewis Carroll, in a letter to illustrator A. B. Frost in 1880, remarks that Frost should spend his advance pay from his work on Rhyme? & Reason? lest he be forced to "do a 'pot-boiler' for some magazine" to make ends meet.
In an early-1980s Time review of a book by Andrew Greeley, the author called his novel Thy Brother's Wife a "...putrid, puerile, prurient, pulpy potboiler".
In the late 1990s, American author and newspaper reporter Stephen Kinzer referred to potboilers in this derogatory sense: "If reading and travel are two of life's most rewarding experiences, to combine them is heavenly. I don't mean sitting on a beach reading the latest potboiler, a fine form of relaxation but not exactly mind-expanding."
In an interview with Publishers Weekly, writer David Schow described potboilers as fiction that "...stacks bricks of plot into a nice, neat line".

See also
Airport novel
 Pot-Bouille, an 1882 novel by Émile Zola
Pulp fiction

Sources and notes

Further reading 
 "Potboiler" at World Wide Words

Writing
Book terminology